Argentine electropop band Miranda! has received 79 nominations and 23 awards, including twenty MTV Video Music Awards Latinoamérica, seven Premios Gardel, one MTV Europe Music Awards, one Los 40 Music Awards, two nominations for the Latin Grammy Awards, one for the Martín Fierro Awards, two for the Nickelodeon Argentina Kids' Choice Awards, and one Silver Seagull, two Golden Tourch and two Silver Tourch at the Viña del Mar International Song Festival.

The band was formed in 2001 in Buenos Aires by musicians Alejandro Sergi, Juliana Gattas, Leonardo Fuentes and Bruno De Vincenti. They have released eight studio albums — Es Mentira (2002), Sin Restricciones (2004), El Disco de Tu Corazón (2007), Miranda Es Imposible! (2009), Magistral (2011), Safari (2014), Fuerte (2017) and Souvenir (2021), and two extended plays — Quereme! Tributo a las Telenovelas (2006) and Precoz (2019). They also released the compilation albums El Templo del Pop (2008) and El Templo del Pop 2 (2016), which include the band's biggest hits such as "Don", "Yo Te Diré", "Perfecta", "Prisonero", "Ya Lo Sabía", "Mentía", among others.

They have achieved gold and platinum certifications in countries such as Argentina, Colombia, Chile and Spain.

Awards and nominations

Other accolades

Listicles

Notes

References

External links
Official Website 

Lists of awards received by musical group